Apollo 18 is a 2011 American-Canadian science fiction horror film written by Brian Miller, directed by Gonzalo López-Gallego, and co-produced by Timur Bekmambetov and Michele Wolkoff. A Canadian-American co-production, its premise is that the cancelled Apollo 18 mission actually landed on the Moon in December 1974, but never returned, and as a result the United States has never launched another expedition to the Moon. The film is shot in found-footage style, supposedly "lost footage" of the Apollo 18 mission that was only recently discovered.

Apollo 18 is López-Gallego's first English-language film. After various release date changes, the film was released in the United States, United Kingdom, and Canada on September 2, 2011. However, the release dates for other territories vary. The film received mostly negative reviews, with most critics comparing it negatively to Paranormal Activity, The Blair Witch Project and Alien.

Plot
In December 1974 (two years after the Apollo 17 mission), the crew of the cancelled Apollo 18 mission is informed that it will now proceed as a top secret Department of Defense (DoD) mission to deliver a classified payload. Commander Nathan Walker, Lieutenant Colonel John Grey, and Captain Ben Anderson are launched, at night, toward the Moon to place an early warning detector for ICBM attacks from the USSR.

Grey remains in orbit aboard the Apollo command module Freedom while Walker and Anderson land on the South Pole of the Moon in the Apollo Lunar Module Liberty, on December 25. While planting the ICBM detector, the pair take rock samples which Anderson describes as feeling "strange". In the background, the camera captures a rock moving in a nearby crater. After returning to Liberty, the pair hear noises outside and the motion sensor camera captures a small rock moving nearby. Houston claims the noises are interference from the ICBM detector. The next day, Anderson finds a rock sample on the floor of Liberty despite having secured the samples. During their ICBM detector set-up, Anderson discovers footprints that lead them to a bloodstained and abandoned (but still functional) Soviet LK lander. Anderson explores a nearby crater, describing the ground as "feeling softer". Inside the crater, he finds a dead cosmonaut as well as a broken space helmet. Walker queries Houston about the Soviet presence, but he is told only to continue with the mission. While they are sleeping, Walker is woken by strange noises and something bumping into the lander.

The following day, the pair find that the flag they had planted is missing. Having completed their mission, the duo prepares to leave, but the launch is aborted when Liberty suffers violent shaking. An inspection reveals extensive damage to the module. Walker finds their shredded flag nearby; the motion sensor camera is also missing, and the rover tipped on its side. He then finds non-human tracks outside Liberty, and cites them as evidence of extraterrestrial life. Walker feels something moving inside his spacesuit and is horrified as a spider-like creature crawls across the inside of his helmet; he disappears from view and Anderson finds him unconscious outside of Liberty. Walker later denies the events. A wound is discovered on his chest, and Anderson removes a Moon rock embedded within him. After having removed the rock, Walker smashes it with a hammer, contaminating the ship. The pair find themselves unable to contact Houston or Grey due to increased levels of interference from an unknown source.

Anderson speculates that the true purpose of the "ICBM warning device" is to monitor the aliens, and that it is the source of the interference. Anderson and Walker attempt to switch the device off, only to discover it has been destroyed, with the same non-human tracks surrounding it. Walker shows signs of a developing infection, such as vein discoloration (possibly caused by necrosis) and blood-shot eyes, and he becomes contentious and paranoid. The mission cameras capture a rock sample moving around in the interior of Liberty, revealing that the aliens are camouflaged as Moon rocks. Increasingly delusional, Walker attempts to destroy the cameras within Liberty with a hammer, but he accidentally damages other controls, causing Liberty to depressurize. Realizing the Soviet LK lander is their only source of oxygen, the pair travel to the LK lander in their Lunar rover. Walker becomes agitated, believing he should not leave the Moon because of the risk of spreading the infection to Earth, and causes the rover to crash. As the rover crashes, the camera catches glimpses of the large space rocks, which begin to grow legs similar to that of spiders.

Anderson awakens and tracks Walker to a crater. Walker is pulled into the crater by the creatures. Anderson gives chase, but he is confronted by the aliens, and flees to the Soviet LK and uses its radio to contact USSR Mission Control, who connect him to the Department of Defense. The Deputy Secretary informs Anderson that they cannot allow him to return to Earth, admitting they are aware of the situation and incorrectly believe he is also infected. Anderson manages to contact Grey and they make arrangements for Anderson to return to Freedom. Anderson prepares the lander for launch, but Walker arrives, revealing that he survived the alien encounter and demanding to be let in. However, he is now completely psychotic and when Anderson refuses to let him in, he tries to break the lander's window with a hammer. Before Walker can enter the vehicle, he is swarmed with rock aliens which break his helmet open and kill him; his body is dragged away by a much larger alien rock.

Anderson launches, but the DoD tells Grey that Anderson is infected, and orders him to abort the rescue or ground communication (without which the CSM will be unable to return to Earth) will be cut off. The lander's engines shut off as it enters orbit; while it is in free fall, small rocks within the craft float in the air, some of which reveal themselves to be rock aliens. Anderson is attacked and infected by the rock aliens, preventing him from controlling the vehicle. Grey warns Anderson that he is approaching too fast, and the footage ends abruptly, implying that the LK and Freedom collided.

The film concludes with a statement giving the "official" fate of the astronauts, describing them as having been killed in various jet accidents that left their bodies unrecoverable. An epilogue notes that many of the hundreds of rock samples returned from the previous Apollo missions, given to dignitaries, are now missing.

Cast
 Warren Christie as Lunar Module Pilot Captain Benjamin "Ben" Anderson
 Lloyd Owen as Commander Nathan "Nate" Walker
 Ryan Robbins as Command Module Pilot Lieutenant Colonel John “Johnny” Grey
 Andrew Airlie as CAPCOM (Thomas Young)
 Michael Kopsa as Deputy Secretary of Defense

Production
Apollo 18 was shot in Vancouver, British Columbia. However, it has been promoted as a "found footage" film that does not use actors. In an interview with Entertainment Weekly, Dimension Films head Bob Weinstein "balk[ed] at the idea" that the film was a work of fiction, stating that "We didn't shoot anything; we found it. Found, baby!"

The Science & Entertainment Exchange provided a science consultation to the film's production team. NASA was also "minimally involved with this picture," but declined to go further with the project.

The film concludes with a statement that the Nixon Administration gave away hundreds of Moon rocks to foreign dignitaries around the world, and that many of these Moon rocks have been lost or stolen. This is actually true; both the Nixon and Ford Administrations gave away 135 Apollo 11 Moon rocks and 135 Apollo 17 goodwill Moon rocks. The Moon Rock Project, a joint effort of over 1,000 graduate students started at the University of Phoenix in 2002, has helped track down, recover or locate many Moon rocks and found that 160 are unaccounted for, lost or destroyed. In 1998, a sting operation called Operation Lunar Eclipse recovered the Honduras Apollo 17 goodwill Moon rock.

The film is distributed by Dimension Films.

Alternate endings and deleted scenes 
Sixteen deleted scenes and four alternate endings are included in the DVD releases. Other deleted scenes have also surfaced that were included in some of the trailers.

Deleted scenes 

A single deleted scene details the fate of the Russian cosmonaut. He is killed when an alien breaks his helmet visor.

Other deleted scenes show two alternate versions of the dead cosmonaut.
Version 1: Walker and Anderson find the cosmonaut's helmet but no Soviet ship. They then find the cosmonaut's body dragged many meters away.  
Version 2: The same as the first but the cosmonaut is partially buried.

Another alternate scene shows Anderson leaving a picture of his family on the surface as he swears that he will get home. As he does, the rocks aliens begin to stalk him. Anderson spots the Soviet lander in the distance and narrowly makes it inside as the aliens chase after him.

In another deleted scene, Grey survives the ordeal and argues with a DoD official back on Earth, who reveals that the astronauts were sent to the Moon to get infected and return to Earth so the United States could use the alien venom as a Bioweapon against the Soviet Union, which is conducting human experiments with the venom.

Alternate endings 

In the first ending, Anderson is in the LK after being attacked by Walker. Anderson is surrounded by the aliens as the LK loses oxygen, and he dies. An alien then leaves the shot.

In the second ending, Anderson is talking with DoD in the LK and sees the veins in his arms turning black, showing he is infected. The infection overtakes him, and he begins to smash the control panel in rage before breaking the camera, leaving his fate unknown.

In the third ending, Anderson is in the LK, with the aliens trying to break in. Suddenly, a large alien breaks the window of the LK and kills Anderson with a pincer.

In the fourth and final ending, an infected Anderson is in the LK. An alarm begins to sound as the lander plummets back to the Moon. The LK impacts with the surface of the Moon.

Release
Apollo 18 was released on September 2, 2011, in multiple countries. Originally scheduled for February 5, 2010, the film's release date was moved ten times between 2010 and 2011.

Home media
The film was released December 27, 2011, on DVD, Blu-ray, and online. Special features include an audio commentary with director López-Gallego and editor Patrick Lussier, deleted and alternate scenes and endings, including footage of how the Russian cosmonaut died and 4 alternate deaths of Ben Anderson.

Reception

Apollo 18 has received mostly negative reviews from critics. Metacritic, which gives an aggregate score between 0 and 100, gives the film a 24 based on 19 critic reviews, which indicates "generally unfavorable reviews". Audiences polled by CinemaScore gave the film an average grade of "D" on an A+ to F scale.

Conversely, Fred Topel of CraveOnline gave the film a positive review, saying that the film "will shock you to your core" and that the last 10 minutes "are the most exciting of any summer movie, and without motion capture effects."

Box office
At the end of its run in 2011, Apollo 18 had earned $17,687,709 domestically, plus $8,548,444 overseas for a worldwide gross of $26,236,153 against a $5 million budget, becoming a financial success. In its opening weekend, Apollo 18 screened in 3,328 theaters and opened in number 3, earning $8,704,271, with an average of $2,615 per theater. In its second weekend, the film earned $2,851,349, dropping 62.7%, with an average of $856 per theater, dropping to number 8, but still had a higher total gross at that point over Shark Night 3D, another horror film opening the same weekend as Apollo 18.

See also
 Moonfall (film), 2022 movie with a similar plot
 Europa Report
 Moon landing conspiracy theories in popular culture
 The Case of the Missing Moon Rocks
 Moon in fiction

References

External links
 
 
 
 

2011 films
2011 horror films
18 film
American science fiction horror films
American alternate history films
Canadian alternative history films
Films about astronauts
Films about space hazards
Films about the Apollo program
Films about extraterrestrial life
Films set in 1974
Films shot in Vancouver
Found footage films
American independent films
Canadian independent films
Dimension Films films
2010s science fiction horror films
Canadian science fiction horror films
Bazelevs Company films
Lunar modules
2010s English-language films
Films directed by Gonzalo López-Gallego
2010s American films
2010s Canadian films